The Red Pockau is a  left tributary of the Black Pockau in the Ore Mountains.

Course 
Between the Marienberg and the roughly 100 metre higher Kühnhaide plateaux the Red Pockau has cut deeply into the terrain. Below the ponds called the Rätzteiche, there is a steep-sided V-shaped valley that becomes more canyon-like below Pobershau. At the northern exit of Pobershau it collects the Schlettenbach stream. A few hundred metres further on the Red Pockau discharges into the Black Pockau at a height of about 490 m above sea level (NN).

Tributaries 
 Nasser Brückenbach (r)
 Weißwasser (l)
 Rotepfützenbach (l)
 Mothäuser Bach (r)
 Wildsbergbach (r)
 Bärengrundbach (l)
 Goldkronenbach (r)
 Schlettenbach (l)

Name 
In former times, the Red Pockau used to be called "the Little Bockau or the Red Water" (die kleine Bockau oder das rothe Wasser) and the Black Pockau (Schwarze Pockau) the "Great Bockau" (Große Bockau) or "the Black Water" (das schwarze Wasser).

See also 
List of rivers of Saxony

References 

Rivers of Saxony
Rivers of the Ore Mountains
Rivers of Germany